The Lufeng Formation (formerly Lower Lufeng Series) is a Lower Jurassic sedimentary rock formation found in Yunnan, China.  It has two units: the lower Dull Purplish Beds/Shawan Member are of Hettangian age, and Dark Red Beds/Zhangjia'ao Member are of Sinemurian age.  It is known for its fossils of early dinosaurs.  The Dull Purplish Beds have yielded the possible therizinosaur Eshanosaurus, the possible theropod Lukousaurus, and the "prosauropods" "Gyposaurus" sinensis, Lufengosaurus, Jingshanosaurus, and Yunnanosaurus. Dinosaurs discovered in the Dark Red Beds include the theropod Sinosaurus triassicus, the "prosauropods"  "Gyposaurus", Lufengosaurus, and Yunnanosaurus, indeterminate remains of sauropods, and the early armored dinosaurs Bienosaurus and Tatisaurus.

Paleofauna

Rhynchocephalians

Crurotarsans

Ornithischians
Indeterminate ornithopod remains Yunnan. Dark Red Beds.

Sauropodomorphs

Theropods

Cynodonts

See also 
 List of dinosaur-bearing rock formations

References

Bibliography 
 
 Weishampel, David B.; Dodson, Peter; and Osmólska, Halszka (eds.): The Dinosauria, 2nd, Berkeley: University of California Press. 861 pp. .

Geologic formations of China
Jurassic System of Asia
Jurassic China
Hettangian Stage
Pliensbachian Stage
Sinemurian Stage
Mudstone formations
Sandstone formations
Siltstone formations
Fluvial deposits
Lacustrine deposits
Paleontology in Yunnan